The newly named Nutrien Fringe Theatre Festival is an annual fringe theatre festival in Saskatoon, Saskatchewan, Canada.   A fringe festival is not censored, and not juried, provides live theatre inexpensively, and a public busking forum for musicians.  The PotashCorp Fringe Theatre Festival is hosted annually in the Broadway District in the Nutana neighborhood in six temporary theatre venues. The festival is a major tourism destination.

General
The Nutrien Fringe is held in July / August annually in Saskatoon. The festival features independent theatre from around the world, Canada, and Saskatchewan in a schedule of 200+ shows. Additional attractions include Saskatoon's only ten-day street festival with craft vendors, food vendors and professional buskers. 50,000 people attend the event annually and the ticketed theatre audience is 11,000.

The show schedule typically features thirty-three (33) theatre groups with the slots equally allocated to Saskatchewan artists, national artists and international artists. The selection process is a lottery system. The artist call opens in September annually. Information and registration forms are available online at www.yxefringe.com.

History

The Saskatoon Fringe Festival was created and was first launched and produced by 25th Street Theatre Artistic Director Tom Bentley-Fisher. The first (mini) Fringe was held in the summer of 1989 in the Duchess Street theatre venue in Saskatoon, as touring Fringe theatre artists between Winnipeg and Edmonton's Fringe sought performance opportunities in Saskatoon. In 1990, the Fringe moved to its regular Broadway Avenue venues to great success with a 6000 seat audience in its first full offering of theatre.

Saskatoon now proudly hosts one of the top ten Fringes in North America by artist earnings and has garnered a reputation as one of the favorites on the Canadian Fringe tour.

References

External links
 Official website of 25th Street Theatre
 The Fringe – Saskatoon Starphoenix Article

Festivals in Saskatoon
Theatre festivals in Saskatchewan
Summer festivals
Festivals established in 1990
Fringe festivals in Canada
1990 establishments in Saskatchewan